Palazzo Palmerini (formerly Mastrandrea) is a 16th century civic building located in Alcamo, in the province of Trapani:
the Palace is situated at Via Buonarroti.

History
The ownership of this mansion to the Mastrandrea family is deduced from  the deed drawn by the notary Aversa on 16 June 1562. The historian Pietro Maria Rocca, from Alcamo, mentions some  notarial contracts, between 1533 and 1534, which testify that the tower was built in this period. 
After the Mastrandreas,  the owners were the Tornamiras, and finally the Palmerinis.

Description
The building dates back to the late Middle Ages. It has a battlement tower and was built for the prestige of the family that built it. The tower, with corbels at Machicoulis (as in the architecture of the time), is located at the corner between Via Buonarroti and Via Madonna dell'Alto; the corner, made with ashlars on which the coat of arms (represented by a shield with the shape of a horse head with a stripe in the middle of it, surmounted by a star) is placed, is a particular one.
 
On the ground floor of via Buonarroti there are three entrances:  one is a round arch; there are two windows on its sides.  On the first floor are a window and two balconies with stone corbels, and a recent one with a marble gallery which is sustained by iron supports.  Its portal is 16th century in style. 
  
As the historian Francesco Maria Mirabella affirms,  after the Jesuits  came back to Alcamo in 1806, the Municipality had to give  the Collegio back to them, and then decided to rent the palace of Mastrandreas,  that belonged to signor Benedetto Palmerini at that time. 
Between 1835 and 1841 the building was divided into different parts by the owner, signora Orofino Palmerini, and leased to four families simultaneously.

References

Sources
Roberto Calia: I Palazzi dell'aristocrazia e della borghesia alcamese; Alcamo, Carrubba, 1997
P.M. Rocca: Di alcuni antichi edifici di Alcamo; Palermo, tip. Castellana-Di Stefano, 1905
Giuseppe Polizzi: I monumenti di antichità e d'arte della provincia di Trapani; Trapani, Giovanni Modica Romano, 1879
Francesco Maria Mirabella: Alcamensia noterelle storiche con appendice di Documenti inediti p. 28; Alcamo, ed. Sarograf, 1931

See also 
 Palazzo De Ballis
 Alcamo
 Pietro Maria Rocca

Buildings and structures in Alcamo
Buildings and structures completed in the 16th century
16th-century establishments in Italy